Rishi is an Indian film, theatre and television actor. He is known for his work on Sun TV's Deala No Deala, the Tamil-language version of Deal or No Deal and Kaiyil Oru Kodi, the Tamil version of Million Dollar Money Drop. Rishi has appeared in supporting roles in Tamil films most notably Anandha Thandavam and Payanam. 
He has stayed away from the limelight since 2017.

Television 
Rishi appeared in a few fiction and non-fiction shows on STAR Vijay before appearing on Sun TV with Endemol's Dealaa No Dealaa (Tamil version of Deal or No Deal). This was a runaway success with Rishi's anchoring style making him a household name among the Tamil people all over the world, with a special fan following in Malaysia and Canada. 
In 2012, Endemol South and Sun TV made Kaiyil Oru Kodi, Are you ready? (Tamil version of Million Dollar Money Drop) with Rishi as the anchor. It was one of the most successful shows of the year.
  
In 2009-10 Rishi played the lead in the hugely popular Telugu-language soap opera, Sundarakanda the first Indian TV show to be shot in the USA.

Films 
Rishi made his debut in Anandha Thandavam. (The forgettable and sparsely released Thodakkam came and went noiselessly). He then went on to do supporting roles in a few films like Mandhira Punnagai, Mirattal, Naan Sigappu Manithan and Yaan. He also appeared in the ensemble cast of Payanam (Gaganam in Telugu).

On the stage 
Rishi has appeared in several theatre productions including the Metroplus Theatre Festival with The Madras Players twice.

Filmography

Film

Television
Serials 

Shows

References

Living people
Tamil male actors
Tamil male television actors
Tamil television presenters
Television personalities from Tamil Nadu
Male actors from Chennai
Male actors in Tamil cinema
Male actors from Tamil Nadu
21st-century Tamil male actors
Tamil Reality dancing competition contestants
1985 births